Ruth Ann O'Brien is an American author and editor best known for her writing in the field of disability studies. She is a professor at the City University of New York.

Education and career 
O'Brien was born in Spokane, Washington, and grew up in California. In 1977 she become a page in the U.S. House of Representatives after being nominated by Representative William M. Ketchum. She earned a B.A. from Claremont Men's College (now Claremont McKenna College) as part of the first group of women to enroll,  and a Ph.D. in political science from University of California, Los Angeles(1991). Following her Ph.D., O'Brien taught at the University of Denver before moving to the City University of New York in 1993. In 2003, she became the executive officer of the Ph.D./M.A. program in political science at the CUNY Graduate Center. As of 2022, O'Brien is a professor at the City University of New York.

O'Brien is known for her writings and discussions on the Americans with Disabilities Act of 1990 and the implications for the workplace. Her book Crippled Justice was the first written history of the Americans with Disabilities Act, and was reviewed by Leonard Kriegel and others. In Bodies in Revolt she examined disability in the workplace, and this book was reviewed in Law & Society Review in 2008. She has also published on Barack Obama's presidency.

Selected publications

References 

Living people
University of California, Los Angeles alumni
Claremont McKenna College
City University of New York faculty
Disability studies academics
American women writers
Year of birth missing (living people)